The 2016–17 Santa Clara Broncos women's basketball team represented Santa Clara University in the 2016–17 college basketball season. The Broncos, led by first year head coach Bill Carr. The Broncos were members of the West Coast Conference and play their home games at the Leavey Center. They finished the season 14–16, 9–9 in WCC play to finish in a tie for fifth place. They lost in the quarterfinals of the WCC women's tournament to Saint Mary's.

Roster

Schedule and results

|-
!colspan=9 style="background:#AA003D; color:#F0E8C4;"| Exhibition

|-
!colspan=9 style="background:#AA003D; color:#F0E8C4;"| Non-conference regular season

|-
!colspan=9 style="background:#AA003D; color:#F0E8C4;"| WCC regular season

|-
!colspan=9 style="background:#AA003D;"| WCC Women's Tournament

See also
 2016–17 Santa Clara Broncos men's basketball team

References

Santa Clara Broncos women's basketball seasons
Santa Clara
Santa Clara
Santa Clara